São José do Cedro is a municipality in the state of Santa Catarina in the South region of Brazil most known for its indigenous population.

See also
List of municipalities in Santa Catarina

References

Municipalities in Santa Catarina (state)